Marianne Phoebe Elliott  (born 27 December 1966) is a British theatre director and producer who works on the West End and Broadway. She has received numerous accolades including three Laurence Olivier Awards and four Tony Awards.

Initially determined not to go into theatre, Elliott began working at the Royal Exchange, Manchester eventually becoming an Associate Director of the Royal Court Theatre in London in 2002. Known for her extensive work at the Royal National Theatre from 2006 to 2017, she established her own theatre production company with producer Chris Harper in 2016. She has received critical and box-office success directing West End original productions of War Horse in 2007, and The Curious Incident of the Dog in the Night-Time in 2012, as well as revivals of Tony Kushner's Angels in America in 2017, Stephen Sondheim's musical Company in 2018 and Arthur Miller's Death of a Salesman in 2019, all of which transferred to Broadway.

Elliott was appointed Officer of the Order of the British Empire (OBE) in Queen Elizabeth II's 2018 Birthday Honours for her services to theatre.

Early life 
Elliott was born in 1966 in London, the daughter of Michael Elliott, theatre director and co-founder of the Royal Exchange theatre in Manchester, and actress Rosalind Knight. Her maternal grandfather was the actor Esmond Knight. The family moved to Manchester when she was eight years old and attended St Hilary's School, Alderley Edge, Didsbury Road Junior School in Heaton Moor and later Stockport Grammar School.

She has said she "hated" the theatrical professions as a child "and used to ask [her parents] not to talk shop". Despite this early ambivalence, she studied drama at Hull University, but used "to sneak into English lectures because she found them more interesting".

Elliott's father, Michael, died when she was a teenager. She said "I don’t think I would have gone into the theatre at all if my father had lived because he was so good at it. I didn’t make the decision to direct until I was in my late 20s, a good 10 years after he died."

Career
After leaving university Elliott was, initially, determined not to go into the theatre and had a number of different jobs including casting director and drama secretary at Granada Television. It was an assistant director role at Regent's Park that first moved her in the direction of a theatrical career.

Royal Exchange, Manchester (1995–2002)  

In 1995 she began to work at the Royal Exchange, where her father had been a founding artistic director. She was nurtured by Greg Hersov, who she has described as her "biggest influence", and she worked her way up including being appointed artistic director in 1998. In her own estimation, two stand-out productions from that period were a 2000 As You Like It and the world premiere of Simon Stephens' play Port.

Royal Court Theatre, London (2002–2006) 

In 2002 Elliott's career saw her move from Manchester to London, when she was invited by Artistic Director Ian Rickson to become an associate director of the Royal Court Theatre. During this time, Elliott's productions included Notes on Falling Leaves by Ayub Khan Din, The Sugar Syndrome by Lucy Prebble, Stoning Mary by Debbie Tucker Green and Local as well as many new writing workshops and play readings.

Royal National Theatre (2006–2017)  

In 2006, she was invited by Nicholas Hytner, who Elliott has said "seemed to value [her] talent more highly than I did" to make her National Theatre debut with Ibsen's Pillars of the Community, which led to her being invited back to direct Saint Joan, starring Anne-Marie Duff, which won the Olivier Award for Best Revival in 2008. She became an associate director under Hytner, and directed a series of important, influential and highly successful productions including War Horse and The Curious Incident of the Dog in the Night-Time. She left the National Theatre in 2017.

Elliott & Harper Productions (2016–present)  

In 2016, Elliott teamed up with theatre producer Chris Harper to set up theatre company Elliott & Harper Productions. Its first production was the West End premiere of Heisenberg by Simon Stephens, directed by Elliott at the Wyndham's Theatre (3 October 2017 – 6 January 2018) which garnered mixed reviews and poor houses; an inauspicious start to the collaboration. Elliott & Harper became co-producers of the National Theatre's Broadway transfer of Angels in America which opened in March 2018, also directed by Elliott.

The company produced the second West End revival of Company in which Bobbie was played by a woman. It opened at the Gielgud Theatre in September 2018 and the cast included Rosalie Craig as Bobbie, Patti LuPone as Joanne, Mel Giedroyc as Sarah and Jonathan Bailey as Jamie (originally a woman named Amy). Elliott commented that Stephen Sondheim "didn’t like the idea at first, but he agreed to let me workshop it in London. We filmed part of it and sent it to him in New York, and he said he loved it. He has agreed to the odd lyric change, but essentially I’m hoping to tweak it as little as possible. Reviving Company 47 years on, I think it actually makes more sense for Bobbie to be a woman."

In 2018, Elliott's first episode of Desert Island Discs  aired on BBC Radio 4, presented by Kirsty Young.

Elliott & Harper have also produced a new adaptation of C. S. Lewis's The Lion, the Witch and the Wardrobe with Catherine Schreiber and West Yorkshire Playhouse. Directed by Sally Cookson, it ran at the West Yorkshire Playhouse until 27 January 2018 and transferred to the Bridge Theatre in London for Christmas 2019. It is due to go on a UK tour in Christmas 2021. In 2019, Elliott co-directed Death of a Salesman alongside Miranda Cromwell, which starred Wendell Pierce and Sharon D. Clarke at the Young Vic Theatre with an all-black Loman family. In autumn 2019, the production transferred to the Piccadilly Theatre and performed to rave reviews and sold-out audiences, despite the ceiling collapse at the Piccadilly Theatre in November 2019.

In March 2020, Elliott's Olivier-award-winning production of Company opened at the Bernard Jacobs Theatre on Broadway on Stephen Sondheim's 90th Birthday Birthday. The production was forced to close, along with the rest of Broadway, after just 12 previews as a result of the spread of COVID-19. The revival opened December 9, 2021.

Elliott directed Tamsin Greig and Harriet Walter in the new version of Talking Heads by Alan Bennett for the BBC in 2020.

In 2022, the company produced the West End revival of Cock by Mike Bartlett starring Jonathan Bailey at the Ambassadors Theatre for a strictly limited run. The acclaimed production reunited Elliot and Bailey who she previously directed in Company at the West End. The Observer'''s Kate Kellaway called it an "immaculate production," with The Arts Desk writing that it was "brutal, bruising, and brilliant."

 Key collaborations 
Elliott has established creative relationships with actors and theatre creatives through the years:

 Jonathan Bailey in Company, originating the gender-swapped role of Jamie that won the actor a Laurence Olivier Award for Best Actor in a Supporting Role in a Musical in 2019, and the acclaimed West End revival of Cock in 2022
 Rosalie Craig in The Light Princess in 2013 and Company in 2018; Craig received nominations for a Laurence Olivier Award for Best Actress in a Musical for both roles
 Anne-Marie Duff in Saint Joan in 2007 where she was nominated for a Laurence Olivier Award for Best Actress, and Husbands & Sons in 2015
 Simon Stephens, the British playwright, spoke of her as having "an innate sense of democracy. She combines a fearlessly theatrical imagination with a real concern for her audience. [Curious Incident] has to be a piece of theatre you can come to if you’re 10 or if you’re 90. Marianne and the rest of the artistic team were completely committed to trying to get inside Christopher’s head and dramatise his world from within." 
 Bunny Christie, set designer for The Curious Incident of the Dog in the Night-Time and CompanyPersonal life
Elliott married the actor Nick Sidi in 2002, they have one daughter.

 Selected works 

 West End 
 Cock by Mike Bartlett at the Ambassadors Theatre with Jonathan Bailey (2022)
 Death of a Salesman by Arthur Miller co-directed with Miranda Cromwell at the Young Vic Theatre and Piccadilly Theatre, starring Wendell Pierce and Sharon D. Clarke in (2019)
 Company by Stephen Sondheim at the Gielgud Theatre with Rosalie Craig, Patti LuPone, Jonathan Bailey and Mel Giedroyc (2018).
 Angels in America by Tony Kushner at the National Theatre with Nathan Lane and Andrew Garfield (2017).
 Husbands & Sons by D. H. Lawrence. A co-production between the National Theatre and the Royal Exchange with Anne-Marie Duff (2015)
 The Light Princess by George MacDonald adaptation by Samuel Adamson and lyrics and music by Tori Amos at the National Theatre (2013)
 The Curious Incident of the Dog in the Night-Time at the National Theatre with Luke Treadaway, Nicola Walker and Niamh Cusack (2012)
 Season's Greetings by Alan Ayckbourn at the National Theatre with Oliver Chris, Mark Gatiss, Catherine Tate and David Troughton (2010)
 Women Beware Women by Thomas Middleton at the National Theatre with Harriet Walter and Raymond Coulthard (2009)
 All's Well That Ends Well by William Shakespeare at the National Theatre with Michelle Terry, Clare Higgins, Oliver Ford Davies, Conleth Hill and George Rainsford (2009)
 Mrs Affleck by Samuel Adamson at the National Theatre with Claire Skinner and Angus Wright (2009)
 Harper Regan by Simon Stephens at the National Theatre with Lesley Sharp and Michael Mears (2008)
 War Horse adapted by Nick Stafford (co-directed with Tom Morris) at the National Theatre with Angus Wright with Bronagh Gallagher, Patrick O'Kane and Alan Williams (2007)
 Saint Joan by George Bernard Shaw at the National Theatre with Anne-Marie Duff (Evening Standard Award), Angus Wright, Michael Thomas and Paterson Joseph (2007)
 Therese Raquin adapted by Nicholas Wright at the National Theatre with Charlotte Emerson, Ben Daniels, Patrick Kennedy and Judy Parfitt (2006)
 Pillars of the Community by Henrik Ibsen at the National Theatre with Damian Lewis, Lesley Manville and Joseph Millson (2005)
 Stoning Mary by Debbie Tucker Green (2005)
 Notes on Falling Leaves by Ayub Khan Din (2004)
 The Sugar Syndrome by Lucy Prebble (2003)
 Port by Simon Stephens (Pearson Award). World premiere at the Royal Exchange, Manchester with Emma Lowndes (MEN Award) and Andrew Sheridan (2002)
 Design for Living by Noël Coward at the Royal Exchange, Manchester with Victoria Scarborough, Ken Bones and Oliver Milburn (2002)
 The Little Foxes by Lillian Hellman at the Donmar Warehouse with Penelope Wilton, David Calder, Peter Guinness and Matthew Marsh (2001)
 Les Blancs by Lorraine Hansberry. Directed by Greg Hersov and Marianne Elliott with Paterson Joseph (2001)
 As You Like It at the Royal Exchange, Manchester with Claire Price, Tristan Sturrock, Jonathan Slinger, Fenella Woolgar and Peter Guinness (2000)
 A Woman of No Importance by Oscar Wilde at the Royal Exchange, Manchester with Gaye Brown (2000)
 Nude With Violin by Noël Coward at the Royal Exchange, Manchester with Derek Griffiths, John Bennett and Rosalind Knight (1999)
 Martin Yesterday by Brad Fraser. European premiere at the Royal Exchange, Manchester with Ian Gelder and Ben Daniels (1999)
 The Deep Blue Sea by Terence Rattigan at the Royal Exchange, Manchester with Susan Wooldridge and David Fielder (1997)
 Poor Super Man by Brad Fraser. British premiere at the Royal Exchange, Manchester (MEN Award) with Sam Graham (MEN Award) and Luke Williams (MEN Award) (1997)
 I Have Been Here Before by J B Priestley at the Royal Exchange, Manchester with David Horovitch and George Costigan (1996)National Theatre Past Productions 

 Broadway 
 Death of a Salesman by Arthur Miller at the Hudson Theatre on Broadway with Wendell Pierce and Sharon D. Clarke (2022)
 Company by Stephen Sondheim at the Bernard B. Jacobs Theatre on Broadway with Katrina Lenk and Patti Lupone (previews 2020, opening delayed to 2021 due to COVID-19)
 Angels in America by Tony Kushner at Neil Simon Theatre on Broadway with Andrew Garfield and Nathan Lane (2018)
 The Curious Incident of the Dog in the Night-Time by Simon Stephens at the Ethel Barrymore Theatre with Alex Sharp (2015)
 War Horse'' by Nick Stafford based on Michael Morpurgo's book at the Vivian Beaumont Theatre on Broadway (2011)

Bibliography

Honours 
Elliott was appointed Officer of the Order of the British Empire (OBE) in the 2018 Birthday Honours for services to theatre.

Awards and nominations

References

External links

1966 births
Alumni of the University of Hull
British artistic directors
British casting directors
Women casting directors
British theatre directors
Living people
Tony Award winners
Laurence Olivier Award winners
Drama Desk Award winners
People educated at Stockport Grammar School
Women theatre directors